The Veshaw River  is a major tributary to the River Jhelum located in Kulgam District in the Kashmir Valley in the union territory of Jammu and Kashmir, India. It originates in the Pir Panjal Range and forms a waterfall at Aharbal.

Course
The river originates from a oligotrophic lake Kausarnag located at an elevation of 3,962.4 metres above sea level in District Kulgam. The river forms a water fall in Aharbal and passes through Nehama,Adigen, Laisoo, Gudder, Brazloo, Ashmuji, Kelam, Nawapora, Qaimoh and joins with river Jehlum at Sangam.

Flash floods
In year 2014 flash floods, Veshaw Nallah washed away various residential houses in villages Laisoo, Ardigatno, Gund Kelam Kulgam etc. Also hundreds of square kannals(area) of horticultural as well as agricultural land washed away in Village Laisoo Kulgam. The Veshaw Nallah is considered one of the dangerous tributary of Jehlum River because fast flow and frequent flash floods.

See also
Kausar Nag
Aharbal
Mughal Road

References
 

Indus basin
Rivers of Jammu and Kashmir
Rivers of India